On April 7, 2003, in Oakland, California, United States, an anti-war protest occurred at the Port of Oakland. The non-violent protest was organized by Direct Action to Stop the War, a Bay Area peace group, which was protesting against American President Lines, alleging the company shipped arms and supplies for the U.S. military and was profiting from the war on Iraq.

The incident

The police fired wooden dowels projectiles, sting balls, concussion grenades, tear gas and other non-lethal weapons when protesters at the gates of two shipping lines at the port refused an order to disperse. Longshoremen and protestors were injured in the exchange.

Reverberations

The next month after the incident, on May 13, Direct Action to Stop the War again led a march of anti-war activists and community leaders from the West Oakland BART Station to five port gates, and the event remained peaceful.

Criminal charges against 24 activists and one longshoreman were brought and later dropped, and in February, 2005 the Oakland City Council paid $154,000 to 24 people who claimed they were hurt in the demonstration. In 2006, The New York Times reported upon an over $2 million settlement for "dozens of payouts" stemming from the incident, the reported size of the awards from the City ranging from $5,000 to $500,000.

References

Police brutality in the United States
Protests in the San Francisco Bay Area
Port of Oakland
Riots and civil disorder in California
Crimes in Oakland, California